Electric Building may refer to:

in the United States (by state then city)
Western Electric Company Building, Atlanta, Georgia, listed on the National Register of Historic Places (NRHP) in Fulton County
Westinghouse Electric Company Building, Atlanta, Georgia, listed on the NRHP in Fulton County
Union Electric Telephone & Telegraph, Davenport, Iowa, listed on the NRHP in Scott County
Electric Building (Louisville, Kentucky), listed on the NRHP in Jefferson County
Automatic Electric Company Building, Chicago, Illinois, listed on the NRHP in Chicago
United Electric Co. Building, Springfield, Massachusetts, listed on the NRHP in Hampden County
Union Electric Administration Building-Lakeside, Lakeside, Missouri, listed on the NRHP in Miller County
Emerson Electric Company Building, St. Louis, Missouri, listed on the NRHP in St. Louis
Electric Building (Billings, Montana), listed on the NRHP in Yellowstone County
Electric Park Pavilion, Blackwell, Oklahoma, listed on the NRHP in Kay County
Electric Building (Portland, Oregon), listed on the NRHP in Multnomah County
Electric Building (Fort Worth, Texas), listed on the NRHP in Tarrant County

See also
General Electric Building (disambiguation)